The 2018 Tour of Flanders was a road cycling one-day race that took place on 1 April 2018 in Belgium. It was the 102nd edition of the Tour of Flanders and the thirteenth event of the 2018 UCI World Tour.

 rider Niki Terpstra became the first Dutch rider since Adri van der Poel in 1986 to win the Tour of Flanders, having gone clear on the Kruisberg climb.

Teams

As the Tour of Flanders was a UCI World Tour event, all eighteen UCI WorldTeams were invited automatically and obliged to enter a team in the race. Seven UCI Professional Continental teams competed, completing the 25-team peloton.

Results

References

External links

2018 UCI World Tour
2018 in Belgian sport
2018
April 2018 sports events in Belgium